John Illingworth (Stockport, March 10, 1786 – near Guayaquil, August 2, 1853), also known as Juan Illingworth and later John Illingrot, was an English general who served in the Peninsular War and the Spanish American wars of independence. He is considered a national hero in Ecuador.

References

1786 births
1853 deaths
People from Greater Manchester
Members of the National Congress (Ecuador)
19th-century British military personnel
Ecuadorian military personnel
Naturalized citizens of Ecuador
Admirals
Generals
Exiles
Chilean sailors
19th-century British farmers
British emigrants to Ecuador